
Gmina Grabów nad Pilicą is a rural gmina (administrative district) in Kozienice County, Masovian Voivodeship, in east-central Poland.

Villages
Gmina Grabów nad Pilicą contains the villages and settlements of Augustów, Broncin, Brzozówka, Budy Augustowskie, Celinów, Cychrowska Wola, Czerwonka, Dąbrówki, Dziecinów, Edwardów, Grabina, Grabów nad Pilicą, Grabów Nowy, Grabów Zaleśny, Grabowska Wola, Kępa Niemojewska, Koziołek, Łękawica, Lipinki, Nowa Wola, Paprotnia, Strzyżyna, Tomczyn, Utniki, Wyborów, Zakrzew and Zwierzyniec.

Neighbouring gminas
Gmina Grabów nad Pilicą is bordered by the gminas of Głowaczów, Magnuszew, Stromiec and Warka.

References
 Polish official population figures 2006

Grabow nad Pilica
Kozienice County
Kielce Voivodeship (1919–1939)